Midori Shimizu may refer to:

Married name of Olga Sapphire (1907–1981), Russian and Japanese ballerina and choreographer
Married name of Midori Fumoto (born 1971), Japanese long-distance runner